The 2015 Rogers Cup presented by National Bank was a tennis tournament played on outdoor hard courts. It was the 126th edition (for the men) and the 114th (for the women) of the Canadian Open, and was part of the ATP World Tour Masters 1000 of the 2015 ATP World Tour, and of the WTA Premier 5 tournaments of the 2015 WTA Tour, plus is the 2015 US Open Series event. The men's event was held at the Uniprix Stadium in Montreal, from August 10 to August 16, and the women's event at the Aviva Centre in Toronto, from August 10 to August 16.

Second seed Andy Murray won the Men's singles title while Belinda Bencic won the Women's singles title.

Points and prize money

Point distribution

Prize money

ATP singles main-draw entrants

Seeds

 1Rankings are as of August 3, 2015

Other entrants
The following players received wild cards into the main singles draw:
  Philip Bester 
  Frank Dancevic 
  Filip Peliwo
  Vasek Pospisil

The following player received entry using a protected ranking into the singles main draw:
  Janko Tipsarević

The following players received entry from the singles qualifying draw:
  Chung Hyeon
  Alexandr Dolgopolov 
  Ernests Gulbis 
  Denis Kudla 
  Lu Yen-hsun 
  Donald Young 
  Mikhail Youzhny

The following player received entry as a lucky loser:
  Nicolas Mahut

Withdrawals
Before the tournament
  Roger Federer (schedule change) → replaced by  Jerzy Janowicz
  David Ferrer (injury) → replaced by  Sergiy Stakhovsky
  Guillermo García López (injury) → replaced by  Gilles Müller
  Richard Gasquet (illness) → replaced by  Nicolas Mahut
  Juan Mónaco (injury) → replaced by  João Sousa

Retirements
  Stan Wawrinka (back injury)

ATP doubles main-draw entrants

Seeds

 Rankings are as of August 3, 2015

Other entrants
The following pairs received wildcards into the doubles main draw:
  Lleyton Hewitt /  Nick Kyrgios
  Adil Shamasdin /  Philip Bester

WTA singles main-draw entrants

Seeds

 1 Rankings are as of August 3, 2015

Other entrants
The following players received wild cards into the main singles draw:
  Françoise Abanda
  Gabriela Dabrowski
  Simona Halep 
  Carol Zhao

The following player received entry using a protected ranking into the main singles draw:
  Dominika Cibulková

The following players received entry from the singles qualifying draw:
  Misaki Doi
  Mariana Duque Mariño
  Irina Falconi
  Olga Govortsova
  Polona Hercog
  Mirjana Lučić-Baroni
  Monica Puig
  Anna Tatishvili
  Lesia Tsurenko 
  Heather Watson
  Yanina Wickmayer
  Carina Witthöft

The following player received entry as a lucky loser:
  Julia Görges

Withdrawals
Before the tournament
  Camila Giorgi (illness) → replaced by  Karin Knapp
  Madison Keys (left wrist injury) → replaced by  Julia Görges
  Svetlana Kuznetsova (left leg injury) → replaced by  Alison Van Uytvanck
  Maria Sharapova (right leg strain) → replaced by  Alison Riske

Retirements
  Simona Halep

WTA doubles main-draw entrants

Seeds

 Rankings are as of August 3, 2015

Other entrants
The following pairs received wildcards into the doubles main draw:
  Françoise Abanda  /  Heidi El Tabakh
  Belinda Bencic /  Dominika Cibulková
  Sharon Fichman  /  Carol Zhao
  Daria Gavrilova /  Simona Halep

Withdrawals
Before the tournament
  Anastasia Pavlyuchenkova

Finals

Men's singles

  Andy Murray defeated  Novak Djokovic, 6–4, 4–6, 6–3

Women's singles

  Belinda Bencic defeated  Simona Halep, 7–6(7–5), 6–7(4–7), 3–0 ret.

Men's doubles

  Bob Bryan /  Mike Bryan defeated  Daniel Nestor /  Édouard Roger-Vasselin, 7–6(7–5), 3–6, [10–6]

Women's doubles

  Bethanie Mattek-Sands /  Lucie Šafářová defeated  Caroline Garcia /  Katarina Srebotnik, 6–1, 6–2

References

External links
Official website - Men's tournament
Official website - Women's tournament

 
2015